Creel and Creels can refer to:

Creel (basket), a type of basket used in fly fishing and commercial fishing
Creel (surname)
Creel, Chihuahua, a town in Mexico
Creel-Terrazas Family, a notable family in the Mexican state of Chihuahua
a series of bobbins holding the roving on a spinning mule
an overhead clothes airer
a crater on Mars
Creels, West Virginia
Jargon for a type of fishing or shellfishing harvester interview to determine Catch Per Unit Effort

See also
 
Creal (disambiguation)
Creole (disambiguation)
Creelman, a surname